The president of the Republic of Uganda is the head of state and the head of government of Uganda. The president leads the executive branch of the government of Uganda and is the commander-in-chief of the Uganda People's Defence Force.

The incumbent Yoweri Museveni came to power in 1986 and is the longest serving president of Uganda, ahead of Idi Amin who ruled from 1971 to 1979. Bobi Wine has not conceded the 2021 election and claims his victory is disputed for the 2021 Ugandan general election.

Qualifications

In 2005 presidential term limits were removed, and in 2017, the removal of the previous upper age limit of 75 was also announced.

Qualifications of the President. (Article 102)
A person to qualify for election as president must be—
(a) a citizen of Uganda by birth;
(b) not less than thirty-five and not more than seventy-five years of age; and
(c) qualified to be a member of Parliament.

State House 
State House is the official residence of the President of Uganda. The main State House is located at Entebbe while the second State House is at Nakasero.

List of presidents of Uganda (1962–present)

See also

List of heads of state of Uganda
Vice President of Uganda
Prime Minister of Uganda
Politics of Uganda
History of Uganda
List of political parties in Uganda

References

External links
State House of the Republic of Uganda official site
Uganda Elections 2006: Coverage on UGPulse
Uganda's Rulers Past and Present, Children's Welfare Mission, Uganda

Uganda
 
Presidents
1963 establishments in Uganda